Pouya Air, trading as Pouya, is an Iranian cargo airline with its head office at Mehrabad International Airport in Tehran. Third party maintenance is also performed.

History
In late 2012, Yas Air changed its name to Pouya Air, reflecting the third name change for this company since it began operations in 2000 as Qeshm Air.  The first name change was to Pars Air in 2006 and later to Yas Air in 2008. Pouya Air is identified today as an alias for designated Iranian airline Yas Air, which was designated in March 2012 pursuant to E.O. 13224 for acting for or on behalf of the IRGC-QF for transporting illicit cargo, including weapons, to Iran's clients in the Levant.

Fleet
As of April 2019 the Pouya Air fleet consists of the following aircraft:

See also
 List of airlines of Iran
 Iran Aviation Industries Organization

References

External links

 Official website

Airlines of Iran
Iranian companies established in 2008
Airlines established in 2008
Iranian entities subject to the U.S. Department of the Treasury sanctions